Pocket Maar is a 1974 Hindi film directed by Ramesh Lakhanpal. The film stars Dharmendra, Saira Banu, Prem Chopra, Mehmood and Nasir Hussain. The music was composed by Laxmikant Pyarelal. The film took 4 years in the making.

Plot

Mr. Rai is a big businessman. Asha, Mr. Rai's Grand Daughter. She loves Madan and marry with her. Mr. Rai don't know anything about Madan. If they say yes to the happiness of granddaughter. Shankar is a pick-pocket. Asha introduces Shankar to everyone as Madan. Who is the real Madan? Asha to do that?

Cast

 Dharmendra as Shankar
 Saira Banu as Asha Rai
 Prem Chopra as Madan Malhotra
 Mehmood as Sunder
 Nasir Hussain as Mr. Rai
 Shubha Khote as Sheela Verma
 Azra as Ganga
 Asit Sen as Dr. Sen
 Amol Sen as Subedar 
 Praveen Paul as Mrs. Verma
 Keshav Rana as Pran Lal
 Shanti Swaroop
 Prem Mannade
 Masood
 Baldev Mehta
 Radheshyam

Crew

Director = Ramesh Lakhanpal
Producer = Ramesh Lakhanpal and Joginder Singh Luthra
Assistant Director = Roop Sharma, Vijay Maini, Roop Kumar
Cinematography = Kishore Rege
Film Editing = Pran Mehra
Art Director = V. Jadhav
Art Department = Abu Hassan Mistry
Hair Stylist = Geeta, Flory Pattrick, Yen Young Sheish
Sound Recordist = S.C. Bhambri
Special Effects = Prafull Gade(main titles), Suresh Naik and M.A. Hafeez(special effects)
Costumes : Naseem Banu (Saira Banu's costumes), Kashinath, Dhiren Kumar and Shantaram Prabhulkar (Dress)
Choreographer: Suresh Bhatt, Kamal, Surya Kumar, P.L. Raj

Soundtrack

The lyrics for the film songs were written by Anand Bakshi, and the music was composed by Laxmikant–Pyarelal.

References

External links

1974 films
1970s Hindi-language films
Indian drama films
Films scored by Laxmikant–Pyarelal
1974 drama films
Hindi-language drama films